Patrick Timothy Crerand (born 19 February 1939) is a Scottish former footballer who played as a midfielder. After six years at Celtic, he moved to Manchester United where he won the English League title twice, the FA Cup, the FA Charity Shield twice and the European Cup. He also gained 16 international caps for Scotland.

He spent one season managing Northampton Town and has since forged a career in the media. He started on radio, and later commentated on matches for MUTV.

Early and personal life
Crerand was born to Irish immigrants in the Gorbals area of Glasgow on 19 February 1939. His father, Michael Crerand, was from Newtownstewart, County Tyrone, and his mother, Sarah Boyle, was from Gweedore, County Donegal, where Crerand spent much of his childhood. His father was killed on 12 March 1941 in a German air raid on John Brown's shipyard in Clydebank, where he was working the fire watch on the night of his death; Crerand was two years old.

Crerand married Noreen Ferry, a Scottish girl of Irish descent, in 1963. They have three children, Patrick, Lorraine and Danny, who was also a professional footballer. He also has eight grandchildren. Scarlett, Chelsea, Danny, Eina, Ursula, Jade, Saoirse and Nicholas. A cousin, Charlie Gallagher, also later became a footballer with Celtic. In 2007, he released his autobiography Never Turn the Other Cheek.
 
Crerand became involved in Irish politics during the Troubles. He said in his autobiography that he was a friend of John Hume and he had talked to IRA members, including Martin McGuinness, in an effort to resolve the rent strikes of 1975.

Football career
Crerand signed for Celtic, following a spell playing Scottish junior football for Duntocher Hibernian in midfield alongside future Australia international Pat Hughes. After six years at Celtic, making 120 appearances, scoring five goals, he signed for Manchester United on 6 February 1963, the fifth anniversary of the Munich air disaster, making his debut against Blackpool. He was a hard-tackling midfielder who, while known for his tenacity and tackling ability, was also an accurate passer, creating chances for attacking players such as Bobby Charlton and George Best.

Pace was not one of his attributes; pugnacity certainly was. "Where I was brought up, you had to be able to run or fight, and you know about my running," he once told a leading journalist. His pugilistic skills, as well as his immaculate passing, were much appreciated by his teammate George Best who was frequently the target for some rough treatment at the hands of less skilful defenders, especially in European matches. At such times, Best recalled: "I always looked around for Paddy Crerand. He's not a dirty player but he's a case-hardened tough Scottish nut when it comes to a fight."

He helped United to the league championship in 1965 and 1967 and won winners' medals in the 1963 FA Cup Final and 1968 European Cup Final. He represented the Scottish national side on 16 occasions and the Scottish League XI. Crerand was inducted into the Scottish Football Hall of Fame in November 2011.

He retired from playing in 1971, having appeared in 401 games, scoring 19 goals for United. After retiring as a player, he became a coach at United, becoming assistant manager under Tommy Docherty when Docherty was appointed as manager in December 1972. However, Docherty added Frank Blunstone and Tommy Cavanagh to his coaching team soon after, and the arrival of Blunstone and Cavanagh saw Crerand sidelined in Docherty's team. Crerand left United in 1976 and was manager of Northampton Town in 1976–77 and covered United matches on local radio in the 1980s and early 1990s.

Media career
Today, he appears regularly on MUTV, Manchester United's television channel, as a co-commentator on its coverage of all Manchester United first-team and reserve matches, as well as appearing as a pundit on the phone-in show 'The Paddy Crerand Show", where he receives calls from supporters and discusses all things Manchester United. Crerand had previously summarised United matches for Piccadilly Radio in the 1990s before joining MUTV.

In February 2009, Crerand was part of the Manchester United contingent that visited Malta to commemorate the 50th anniversary of the founding of the Malta Manchester United Supporters' Club, the oldest supporters club in the world. During this visit, MUTV and Crerand provided local fans with the opportunity to form part of the audience for his phone-in show.

In 1995, Crerand supported Eric Cantona during the time of his infamous kung-fu kick on Crystal Palace fan Matthew Simmons. Both before and after this incident, Crerand became known for being a 'cheerleader' for the Old Trafford club in media. Speaking in October 2014, former United captain Roy Keane criticised Crerand and Bryan Robson for being biased towards the club in their media work. Keane cited an incident where Nani had been sent off in a Champions League tie against Real Madrid which Keane believed was a correct decision, but Crerand and Robson had believed was incorrect.

On 10 December 2012, Crerand had a hostile reaction during an interview on BBC Radio 5 Live, where he was asked about Rio Ferdinand being struck by a coin from the home crowd during the previous day's Manchester derby.

Career statistics

International appearances

Honours

Club
Manchester United
First Division: 1964–65, 1966–67
FA Cup: 1962–63
European Cup: 1967–68
Charity Shield: 1965, 1967

International
Scotland
British Home Championship: 1961–62

Individual
Scottish Football Hall of Fame: 2011 inductee

References

1939 births
Living people
Scottish footballers
Scotland under-23 international footballers
Scotland international footballers
Celtic F.C. players
Scottish expatriates in South Africa
Manchester United F.C. players
Manchester United F.C. non-playing staff
Scottish football managers
Northampton Town F.C. managers
Footballers from Glasgow
People from Gorbals
Scottish people of Irish descent
Bidvest Wits F.C. players
Expatriate soccer players in South Africa
People educated at Holyrood Secondary School
Scottish Football Hall of Fame inductees
Scottish Football League players
Scottish Football League representative players
English Football League players
Duntocher Hibernian F.C. players
Association football midfielders
UEFA Champions League winning players
FA Cup Final players